Magnificent Warriors (also known as Dynamite Fighters) is a 1987 Hong Kong martial arts action adventure film directed by David Chung, and starring Michelle Yeoh, Tung-shing Yee, Richard Ng Yiu-hon and Hwang Jang Lee.

Plot
Some time during the 1930s amidst the Second Sino-Japanese War, Chinese secret agent Fok Ming-ming is sent to Kaa Yi near Tibet to investigate the Japanese occupation that has been set up there. Ming-ming meets with Secret Agent 001, another Chinese secret agent who is to be her contact in Kaa Yi. They first run into a conman and then a rebellious princess, Chin-chin, who join them on their adventures.

Ming-ming and her friends discover that the Japanese occupation plans to convert the town into a weapons manufacturing site, but they are captured before they can warn the locals. Before the group are to be executed (along with Youda, Chin-chin's lover and a local aristocrat who stands up to the Japanese despite initially colluding with them), the locals chant for their release and the local Kaa Yi army turns on the Japanese, firing at the Japanese command and freeing Ming-ming and her friends. The once peaceful citizens of Kaa Yi then prepare to defend their town against the Imperial Japanese Army, under the guidance of Ming-ming and her friends.

Cast
 Michelle Yeoh as Fok Ming-ming
 Derek Yee Tung-Sing as Secret Agent 001
 Richard Ng Yiu-hon as Drifter Conman
 Lowell Lo Koon-Ting as Youda
 Cindy Lau Chin-Dai as Chin-chin
 Matsui Tetsuya as General Toga
 Hwang Jang Lee as General Toga's Henchman #1
 Meng Lo as General Toga's Henchman #2
 Jing Chen as Gunrunner
 Chiu Chi-ling as One of revenge seeking trio #1
 Jackson Ng Yuk-sue as One of revenge seeking trio #2
 Fung Hak-on as Japanese agent
 Ku Feng as Ming's Grandfather

DVD release
On 21 May 2001, DVD was released in Hong Kong Legends at UK in Region 2.

Five years later, The Michelle Yeoh Collection DVD were released on 9 January 2006 at 3 disc set including two films they were: Police Assassins and Wing Chun.

External links
 
 Magnificent Warriors on hkmdb

1987 films
1980s action adventure films
Hong Kong action films
1987 martial arts films
Girls with guns films
Hong Kong martial arts films
1980s Hong Kong films